Nathaniel Livermore Stebbins (January 9, 1847 - July 10, 1922) was a noted American marine photographer, whose surviving photographs document an important era in the development of American maritime activities, as sweeping technological and social changed revolutionized activity on the water, in military, commercial and leisure spheres.

In addition to selling prints of his images, he also produced a number of books of nautical images in his lifetime, including an important illustrated coastal guide, which was path-breaking in showing the practical uses for photography. His photography (and, on occasion, writing) also appeared in such well-known magazines as The Rudder and Yachting.

Over his working career as a commercial photographer (from 1884 to 1922), he took approximately 25,000 images. Of these, about 60% were of marine subjects (the majority of those being of leisure activities, but many are of military and commercial scenes, a valuable record for historians). The remainder include a wide variety of commercial work, including the theatre, railroads, home interiors, etc.

Biography

He was born in Meadville, Pennsylvania on January 9, 1847, the son of a well-known Unitarian clergyman, Ruphus Phineas Stebbins, and his wife Eliza Clark Livermore. He was always interested in the sea, and as a young man sailed to South America as a passenger, although his early career was not related to either the sea, or photography.

On March 6, 1872, he married Etta Bowles.  They had three children;  Ellen, Charles, and Katharine.

He became interested in photography in about 1882, shortly after the introduction of dry-plate photography, with its fast exposure time and ease of use, made photography more practical. With an interest in the sea, and little competition in that area, it was natural that he should specialize in maritime photography.

He moved his family to the Boston, Massachusetts area to engage in this field, and joined yacht clubs in Boston and Marblehead. It is not known whether his photography business was his sole income; there are indications that either he or his wife had independent means, but little is known.

He went on to publish a number of large-format books showcasing his maritime photography. For his innovative Illustrated Coast Pilot, which illustrated principal landmarks and aids to navigation on the East Coast, he studied for, and passed, the examination for a licensed coastal pilot for a considerable section of the East Coast. This early photographic record may be the first publication to systematically employ photography to illustrate landmarks in a book of sailing directions, a type of navigational aid used by mariners for more than one thousand years.  The first edition (1891) of the Illustrated Coast Pilot covered only the U.S. east coast between New York and Maine. Stebbins extended coverage to the entire Atlantic Coast and the Gulf Coast in the second edition (1896).

It is thought that many of the photographs dating from his latter years were actually taken by assistants, as he was rather frail by then. He was living in West Somerville, Massachusetts when he died, aged 75.

Surviving works

His collection at his death included about 20,000 negatives, almost all on glass plates (the usual medium for high-resolution negatives in his time); it was bought by another photographer, and on his death, many of Stebbins' plates were sold for scrap (tradition holds that they were used in greenhouses).

A few plates found their way to the Peabody Museum in Salem, Massachusetts, and another small group eventually wound up at the Mariners' Museum, but the bulk of the remaining collection (about 5,000 images total, of which a little over 2,500 are the original glass negatives) were rescued for Historic New England by William Appleton, the founder of the Society.

Almost all are of maritime subjects; very little of his non-maritime work survives.

Bibliography
 Nathaniel L. Stebbins, Edward Burgess, American & English Yachts (Charles Scribner's Sons, 1887)
 Nathaniel L. Stebbins, Yacht Portraits of the Leading American Yachts (Boston, 1887)
 Nathaniel L. Stebbins, Illustrated Coast Pilot with Sailing Directions: The Coast of New England from New York to Eastport, Maine, including Bays and Harbors (1891, first edition)
 Nathaniel L. Stebbins, Illustrated Coast Pilot with Sailing Directions: The Atlantic and Gulf Coasts of the United States, including Bays and Harbors (1896, second edition)
 Nathaniel L. Stebbins, The Yachtsman's Album (1896)
 Nathaniel L. Stebbins, George Dewey, The New Navy of the United States (1896)
 W. H. Bunting, Portrait of a Port: Boston 1852 - 1914 (Harvard University Press, Cambridge, 1974)
 Nathaniel L. Stebbins, W. H. Bunting, Steamers, Schooners, Cutters and Sloops: Marine Photographs of N. L. Stebbins Taken 1884-1907 (Houghton Mifflin, Boston, 1974)

External links

 unsorted works - scan hosted by the New York Public Library
Nathaniel L. Stebbins photographic collection at Historic New England

1847_births
1922_deaths
American_photographers
People from Boston
Yachting
People from Meadville, Pennsylvania